is a  town located in Sorachi Subprefecture, Hokkaido, Japan. It is a bed town of Sapporo.

As of September 2016, the town has an estimated population of 7,886, and a density of 96 persons per km2. The total area is 81.49 km2.

Culture

Mascot

He is a cabbage that resembles a healthy child and a sun. He has 200 times of energy.

References

External links

Official Website 

Towns in Hokkaido